is a Japanese butterfly swimmer.

Major achievements
2006 Pan Pacific Swimming Championships
 100m butterfly 2nd (52.59)
 4×100m medley relay 2nd (3:35.70)
2007 World Championships
 50m butterfly 10th (24.03)
 100m butterfly 23rd (53.53)

Personal bests
In long course
 50m butterfly: 23.45 Japanese Record (April 16, 2009)
 100m butterfly: 52.43 (April 20, 2008)
In short course
 50m butterfly: 23.04 (March 16, 2008)
 100m butterfly: 49.90 Asian, Japanese Record (March 8, 2009)

References

 http://www.tv-asahi.co.jp/japan2007/pc/players/0020.html

1981 births
Living people
Japanese male butterfly swimmers
People from Kanagawa Prefecture
World Aquatics Championships medalists in swimming
Asian Games medalists in swimming
Swimmers at the 2006 Asian Games
Universiade medalists in swimming
Asian Games silver medalists for Japan
Medalists at the 2006 Asian Games
Universiade bronze medalists for Japan
Medalists at the 2003 Summer Universiade
20th-century Japanese people
21st-century Japanese people